The Protest Psychosis: How Schizophrenia Became a Black Disease is a 2010 book by the psychiatrist Jonathan Metzl (who also has a Ph.D. in American studies), and published by Beacon Press, covering the history of the 1960s Ionia State Hospital—located in Ionia, Michigan, and converted into the Ionia Correctional Facility in 1986.  The book describes the facility one of America's largest and most notorious state psychiatric hospitals in the era before deinstitutionalization.

Metzl focuses on exposing the trend of this hospital to diagnose African Americans with schizophrenia because of their civil rights ideas. He suggests that in part the sudden influx of such diagnoses could be traced to a change in wording in the DSM-II, which compared to the previous edition added "hostility" and "aggression" as signs of the disorder. Metzl writes that this change resulted in structural racism.

The book was well reviewed in JAMA, where it was described as "a fascinating, penetrating book by one of medicine's most exceptional young scholars." The book was also reviewed in the American Journal of Psychiatry, Psychiatric Services, Transcultural Psychiatry, Psychiatric Times, The American Journal of Bioethics, Social History of Medicine, Medical Anthropology Quarterly, Journal of African American History, Journal of Black Psychology, Health: An Interdisciplinary Journal for the Social Study of Health, Illness and Medicine, and The Sixties: A Journal of History, Politics and Culture.

See also 
 Political abuse of psychiatry in the United States
 Drapetomania
 Political abuse of psychiatry
 Sluggish schizophrenia
List of medical ethics cases

References

External links 
 The Protest Psychosis video recording of talk by Metzl aired on January 13, 2010, by CSPAN-2's Book TV (90 minutes)
 Interview with Metzl about the book by Christopher J. Lane on Psychology Today
 Interview with Metzl on WNYC radio, February 12, 2010
 How the Black man became schizophrenic blog post on the book by Karen Franklin on Psychology Today
 Schizophrenia as Political Weapon. The disease turned from a benign illness to a violent disease in the 1960s, just as black men joined protests against racism. article and interview with Metzl in The Root by Felicia Pride
 The protest psychosis – Essay by Metzl from June 9, 2010, in Michigan Today, summarizing the book's ideas.
 Audio interview with Metzl on "New Books in African American Studies" (44 minutes)
 Metzl discusses his book on ABC Radio National's All In The Mind program (30 minutes)

2010 non-fiction books
American history books
Books about African-American history
History books about medicine
Political abuses of psychiatry
Social problems in medicine
History of psychiatry
History of civil rights in the United States
Beacon Press books
History of Michigan
Ionia County, Michigan
English-language books
Books about schizophrenia